Arthur McFarland (born December 5, 1947) is an actor and former news reporter for WABC-TV in New York City. He was the station's lead education reporter, and has held various positions at WABC since his hiring in August 1983. McFarland was the longest tenured reporter at WABC.

Life and career

In the 1980s, McFarland was an investigative reporter for the station, who helped get children's injustices and unfair treatment exposed by state officials. Art McFarland traveled to South Africa to report on an anniversary of Nelson Mandela and his race to the presidency.

McFarland was involved with WABC's early-morning newscast for many years. He originally was a co-anchor alongside Tim Fleischer, while also presenting the daily weather forecast. When WABC revamped Eyewitness News This Morning in 1992 and hired Bill Evans to be the morning meteorologist, McFarland became the newscast's sports reporter and stayed in that position for several more years. He spent his last several years with WABC serving as the station's education reporter.

In May 2014, WABC-TV announced that Art would be retiring on May 30 after spending 31 years at Eyewitness News.

McFarland currently resides in New York with his family and dog. He is now an actor and has appeared in several TV shows, including Law and Order: Special Victims Unit, and House of Cards.

References

External links
7Online.com: Arthur McFarland official WABC-TV bio

American television journalists
New York (state) television reporters
Television anchors from New York City
Television anchors from Boston
1948 births
Living people
American male journalists